Greatest Hits is the only compilation album by American rock band Boston. Released on June 3, 1997, the album features songs originally released on both the Epic and MCA record labels, as well as three previously unreleased recordings ("Tell Me", "Higher Power" and "The Star-Spangled Banner"). Tom Scholz, the band's leader, felt that the album's audio quality was not up to his standards, so a remastered version of the album was released in 2009 with a slightly different track listing. Boston embarked on a tour for this album both times it was released.

The album was certified double platinum by the RIAA on December 4, 2003, and it has sold 2,234,000 copies in the United States as of August 2014.

The cover features the guitar-shaped spaceship flying low over a planet with turquoise rocks and a turquoise tower in the distance. The backside shows a personification of New York City. It is unknown why the band chose New York City instead of Boston, the city the band is named after and which they usually show on their artwork.

Track listing

Notes

Personnel

Boston 
 Tom Scholz – guitar, bass, organ, drums, clavinet, keyboards, hand clapping
 Brad Delp – vocals, guitar
 Barry Goudreau – guitar
 Fran Sheehan – bass
 Sib Hashian – drums

Additional personnel 
 Jim Masdea – drums
 Gary Pihl – guitar
 Fran Cosmo – vocals
 David Sikes – bass guitar, vocals
 Doug Huffman – drums

Charts

Certifications

References 

1997 greatest hits albums
Albums produced by Tom Scholz
Boston (band) albums
Epic Records compilation albums
Legacy Recordings compilation albums